Kobra Paige (born October 14, 1988) is a Canadian singer and songwriter. She is the founder, lead singer, and songwriter for hard rock and metal band Kobra and the Lotus. She was also a touring guest vocalist for Kamelot and Metal All Stars.

Early years 
At the age of seven, Paige started classical singing lessons and classical piano, and after attending a Judas Priest concert at age 15, decided that metal was the right place for her voice and her passion. "When I saw the way the crowd responded when "Painkiller" started playing, I knew I needed to be part of this culture", said Paige during an interview with Revolver magazine. Paige and her band Kobra and the Lotus would open for Judas Priest at the Hammersmith Apollo four years later in London.

Career

Kobra and the Lotus
Paige answered an ad in a Calgary paper for a drummer for a heavy metal band. She showed up and told them she was not a drummer but a singer, and after jamming through some metal standards, she got the job. "I wanted to find some musicians to jam some Iron Maiden with but by the first practice we started writing our own tunes instead," says Paige in an interview with Femme Metal. The band recorded the first Kobra and the Lotus album Out of the Pit in Calgary with Toronto heavy rocker Greg Godovitz Goddo producing the first cut and mixing the tracks at Metalworks Studios in Toronto. Paige met both Gil Moore and Rik Emmett at the studio, and Rik Emmett did a guitar solo for the KATL cover of "Ace of Spades". After sending the debut CD to a few industry taste makers, Canadian journalist Carl Begai suggested another recording session for the vocals, and Paige re-recorded the vocals and remixed the debut CD with Kevin Shirley providing the first generation of the signature Kobra sound. From the independent release of Out of the Pit, Kobra Paige and her music was noticed by Metal Hammer, and Paige was included in the 2010 Maidens of Metal calendar.

The second album was recorded with producer Julius Butty, and the demo tracks were shopped to Universal Music. Paige and the Lotus wrote recorded Forever One, My Life, 50 Shades of Evil with producer Kevin Churko and added them to the new album.

While touring the third album High Priestess, Paige became quite ill with Lyme disease during the end of The KISS 40th Anniversary World Tour and took time off to recover. During the time off, in order to keep the fans interested, Kobra and the Lotus recorded an EP of their favorite Canadian rock artists and released Words of the Prophets.

Kobra and the Lotus released brand new album Prevail I via Napalm Records on May 11, 2017 with single Light me Up peaking at #34 on Billboard Mainstream Rock. Their fifth studio album, Prevail II, is to release in Spring of 2018. Single TriggerPulse was advance released in October 2016 debuting the band's evolved entrance into hard rock/metal musical blend.

Metal All Stars

Paige joined the super group Metal All Stars in 2014 for a European tour and subsequent South American tour with other vocalists Zakk Wylde, James LaBrie, Udo Dirkschneider, Joey Belladonna, and Max Cavalera.

Kamelot
Kobra and the Lotus did a tour with Kamelot through the United States in 2015, followed by a European tour in 2016. Subsequently, Kamelot has had Paige as a regular guest vocalist on the Haven tour.

We Are Fury
On July 19, electronic pop artists We Are Fury released a new single titled "Heart of Mine" off their upcoming album. This was the first electronic, pop collaboration Paige had written and recorded with anyone.

Other ventures
Paige is the voice of protagonist 'Gitta' in the upcoming music based video game Of Bird and Cage, set to release in 2021.

Personal life
On 19 June 2019, Paige and Kamelot vocalist Tommy Karevik announced they had gotten engaged. In a video message on April 26, 2020, the couple revealed that they were married on April 4.

Discography

Studio albums 
 Out of the Pit (Kobra Music, 2010)
 Kobra and the Lotus (Spinefarm Records, Universal Music Group, 2012)
 High Priestess (2014)
Prevail I (2017) (Napalm Records)
Prevail II (2018) (Napalm Records)
Evolution (2019) (Napalm Records)

EPs 
 Words of the Prophets (2015)

Singles 
 "Here Comes Silverbells!!" (Kobra Music Inc., 2009)
 "Zombie" (Kobra Music Inc., 2015)
 "Remember Me" (Kobra Music Inc., 2015)
 "TriggerPulse" (Napalm Records, 2016)
 "Gotham"  (Napalm Records, 2017)
 "You Don't Know"  (Napalm Records, 2017)
 "Light Me Up"  (Napalm Records, 2017), reached No. 34 on the Billboard Mainstream Rock chart
 "Heart of Mine" (Lowly, 2019)
 "Burn!" (Napalm Records, 2019)
"Get the Fuck Out of Here" (Napalm, 2019)
"Thundersmith" (Napalm, 2019)
 "Everything We Are" (Mighty Music, 2020)

References 

1988 births
Living people
Musicians from Calgary
Canadian women rock singers
Canadian women heavy metal singers
21st-century Canadian women singers